The Scythian, also in English territories as The Last Warrior is a 2018 Russian action drama fantasy film directed by Rustam Mosafir, starring Aleksey Faddeev, Aleksandr Kuznetsov and Vitaly Kravchenko.  It takes place in the 11th century in Ancient Russia, during a time in which grandiose changes are taking place in Eurasia. Once proud warriors, the Scythians have degenerated into vile mercenaries, raiding the civilian population. During one of these raids, warrior Lutobor's wife and child are abducted. However, the hero does not intend to resign himself to fate, and pursues the Scythians in an attempt to save his family. As a guide, he takes the captive Scythian Marten (Kuznetsov) and, despite the huge differences between them, they must work together to survive their journey.

The film was released on January 18, 2018. in Philippines and Vietnam.

Plot 
These are times when one civilization is replacing another. A new era is about to begin in Central Eurasia.

The Scythians, once proud warriors, are all but gone. Their few descendants have become ruthless mercenary assassins, the "Wolves of Ares." Lutobor, is a soldier with a difficult task at hand. He becomes involved in internecine conflicts and sets off on a perilous journey to save his family. His guide is a captive Scythian by the name of Marten. Lutobor and Marten are enemies. They pray to different gods but must embark on this journey together. They brave the wild steppes, moving toward the last haven of the Scythians, to what seems to be their inevitable demise.

Cast

Production

Filming
Filming took place in the Republic of Crimea in autumn 2016. They filmed near Kerch, as well as near Yevpatoriya and Yalta.

References

External links 
 Official website 
 
 
 
 

2010s fantasy drama films
2010s historical fantasy films
2010s fantasy action films
2018 action drama films
2018 war drama films
2018 films
Films based on European myths and legends
Kievan Rus in fiction
Films set in the 1st century
Russian fantasy drama films
Russian fantasy action films
Russian action drama films
Russian historical drama films
Russian war drama films
2010s Russian-language films
Films shot in Crimea
Films shot in Russia